Paula Fernandes de Souza (born August 28, 1984, in Sete Lagoas, Minas Gerais) is a Brazilian singer, songwriter and arranger. In 2011 she was one of the most searched people on Google Brazil. She won a Latin Grammy Awards for her album Amanhecer in 2016.

Biography 

Born in Sete Lagoas, Minas Gerais, she lived on a farm with her parents and her younger brother during her childhood. Fernandes started singing when she was eight years old, releasing her self-titled debut album two years later. Her second album, named Ana Rayo, was released in 1995, and was inspired by the A História de Ana Raio e Zé Trovão telenovela. Fernandes went to college to study Geography in Belo Horizonte when she was 18 years old, singing in pubs during this time. She recorded one of the theme songs of Rede Globo's telenovela América, named "Ave Maria Natureza", and released the album Canções do Vento Sul soon after. Fernandes was nominated for the Best Popular Singer Award at Prêmio da Música Brasileira with that album. The song "Jeito de Mato" from her following album, Pássaro de Fogo, was a theme song on the Globo telenovela Paraíso, and her version of Ivete Sangalo's "Quando a Chuva Passar" was the main theme of the telenovela Escrito nas Estrelas. Fernandes released her first DVD in October 2010, and gained further recognition after she participated in two Rede Globo specials: the Roberto Carlos' end of year show, broadcast on December 25, 2010, and Show da Virada, broadcast during New Year's Eve, on December 31, 2010. Her live album, Paula Fernandes - Ao Vivo, released in 2011, was the top seller of that year. Fernandes became known in the rest of Latin America due to her collaboration on the Juanes song "Hoy Me Voy", released on his 2012 MTV Unplugged album. Her 2013 album Multishow ao Vivo - Um Ser Amor was nominated for the 2014 Latin Grammy Award for Best Sertaneja Music Album, with the title song being nominated in the Best Brazilian Song category. Fernandes was also a singer with another, earlier, famous, group headed by another popular South American, Luciano. Earlier, she sang a Luciano passion song "Saudade Bandida" but was not named the vocalist, or shown in the video. Paula recorded one album in English titled Dust in the Wind in an American western style, see below (EMI). She also recorded a duet with Canadian country singer Shania Twain and one with American singer-songwriter Taylor Swift.

In 2013 Fernandes stated in an interview that she was a follower of Spiritism, leading some Christians to boycott her concerts.

In 2019, her album Hora Certa was nominated for the Latin Grammy Award for Best Sertaneja Music Album. In his international tours, he performed shows for more than 500,000 people, passing through more than 10 countries every year. These are Italy, United Kingdom, Switzerland, Brazil, Portugal, United States, Luxembourg, Angola, Cape Verde, Spain, Argentina and Paraguay.

Discography

Studio albums

Live albums

EPs

Compilation albums

Singles

Awards and nominations

Latin Grammy Award

References

External links 

 Official website
 Interview to Brasileiros magazine

1984 births
Living people
Musicians from Minas Gerais
Sertanejo musicians
Latin music songwriters
21st-century Brazilian singers
21st-century Brazilian women singers
Brazilian spiritualists
Latin Grammy Award winners
Women in Latin music